Guillermo Méndez may refer to:
Guillermo Méndez (footballer, born 1994) (born 1994), Uruguayan footballer
Guillermo Méndez Pereiro (born 1992), Spanish footballer
Guillermo W. Méndez (born 1955), Guatemalan theologian